Mary Holden Coggeshall Seward (July 9, 1839 – circa September 1, 1919), commonly known as Mary C. Seward, was an American poet, composer, and prominent parliamentarian serving humanitarian and woman's club movements of the late nineteenth and early twentieth centuries.  A number of her works were published under the pseudonym "Agnes Burney"
, including several developed in collaboration with her spouse, Theodore F. Seward, an internationally known composer and music educator in his day. She became a groundbreaking advocate for the care and education of blind babies and young children during her later years, serving as president of the department for the blind of the International Sunshine Society.

Early years
Seward was born Mary Holden Coggeshall in New London, Connecticut.   Her father, William Holden Coggeshall, was a veteran of the War of 1812 and a descendant of John Coggeshall, first president of the colony of Rhode Island.  She was educated at the New London Female Academy where she studied under Hiram Warner Farnsworth.  In 1860 she married Theodore F. Seward, a composer and music teacher who had previously worked as organist of a New London church. They lived in Rochester and Brooklyn in New York before relocating to East Orange, New Jersey in 1868.

Poet and composer

Though not prolific, her poems and tunes appeared in numerous periodicals and music books. They were published under her name, her pseudonym Agnes Burney, or anonymously on occasion. Her carol The Christmas Bells (circa 1869) has been set to music by at least five different composers.   She produced tunes for her own lyrics as well as those of other poets; one of the most widely published was her setting of Mary A. Lathbury's Easter Carol (circa 1883).

She had a long creative relationship with her composer husband and wrote verses for many of his songs. The 1867 collection The Temple Choir, one of Theodore F. Seward's most successful hymnbooks, contained both words and music credited to her pseudonym. She frequently accompanied him on business trips, including the second European tour of the Fisk Jubilee Singers in 1875 for which he was voice trainer and musical director.

Club woman and parliamentarian

Seward was involved with the woman's club movement for forty-seven years. She was a member of Sorosis, the first American club dedicated to the improvement and advancement of professional women, and an organizer of the National Society of New England Women which she served twice as president.   She belonged to the Woman's Club of Orange since its inception where, as president, she made the motion calling for the formation of the New Jersey State Federation of Women's Clubs.  She was a charter member of the International Sunshine Society founded by Cynthia W. Alden and served it many years as first vice president.

She identified herself as a “parliamentarian”, one proficient with “the minute details of presiding, of debating, of making motions, of conducting meetings.”  Fellow “club women” described her as follows:

Philanthropy and later years

The International Sunshine Society, of which Seward was an officer, supported "Sunshine Homes" for the care and education of young children with a variety of disabilities.   A Branch for the Blind was created in 1904 to provide services for blind children below the age of eight that existing public programs either ignored or had been housing with the mentally challenged.  The society opposed the then broadly held misconception that blind babies were "feeble-minded".   A preliminary Sunshine Home for blind babies was established in a three-room New York City flat and other donated space. Founder Cynthia W. Alden described the approach: 

In 1905, the International Sunshine Department (originally Branch) for the Blind was separately incorporated with Seward serving as president. It acquired property in Dyker Heights, Brooklyn, New York for a larger facility to function as a combined home, nursery, hospital, and kindergarten. They petitioned the New York City Board of Education for support and in 1907 the Dyker Heights Home for Blind Babies became the site of the first public kindergarten for blind children in the United States operated by a major board of education. Seward subsequently became president of the Arthur Home for Blind Babies in Summit, New Jersey when it was established as a second combined facility in 1909.

The  for the Blind also pursued critical legislative support. New York City passed the first legislation addressing the education and training of blind babies and young children in 1908. Thirteen states implemented relevant laws during the decade that followed, including New Jersey in 1911 and New York in 1912. Seward reported that "legislation in behalf of the blind baby was conceded by all members to be the greatest work of the society."

Seward continued to work as an advocate for blind babies and director of Arthur Home for the remainder of her life.   As an officer of the International Sunshine Society, she performed these tasks without pay or other compensation. She died suddenly on board a train bound for Buffalo, New York a few days before September 3, 1919.

References

Sources

External links

1839 births
1919 deaths
American composers
American Christian hymnwriters
Composers of Christian music
Writers from New London, Connecticut
Writers from East Orange, New Jersey
19th-century American writers
American women poets
19th-century American women writers
Women religious writers
Songwriters from New Jersey
Songwriters from Connecticut
American women hymnwriters
American women non-fiction writers
Musicians from New London, Connecticut
Clubwomen
19th-century American philanthropists
19th-century American women musicians